The Bergen County Board of Commissioners  (formerly the Bergen County Board of Chosen Freeholders) is a Board of seven people who govern Bergen County, New Jersey alongside the Bergen County Executive. The members are elected at-large to three-year terms of office on a staggered basis with either two or three seats coming up for election each year. At an annual reorganization meeting in the beginning of January, the board elects a chair, Vice Chair and Chair Pro Tempore from among its members. As of 2021, Bergen County's Commissioners are Chair Steven A. Tanelli (D, North Arlington, term ends December 31, 2021), Vice Chair Tracy Silna Zur (D, Franklin Lakes, term ends December 31, 2021), Chair Pro Tempore Dr. Joan M. Voss (D, Fort Lee, December 31, 2023), Mary J. Amoroso (D, Mahwah, term ends December 31, 2022), Ramon M. Hache, Sr. (D, Ridgewood, term ends December 31, 2023), Germaine M. Ortiz (D, Emerson, term ends December 31, 2022), and Thomas J. Sullivan (D, Montvale, term ends December 31, 2022).

Responsibilities 
The Board is responsible for creating the laws for Bergen County. Most importantly the Board is responsible for creating and adopting a yearly budget for the county.

Party affiliation

Sessions

2020 
In 2020, the Board chose Commissioner Mary J. Amoroso to serve as chair of the board, Dr. Joan M. Voss as Vice Chair, and Steven A. Tanelli as Chair Pro Tempore.

2019 
In 2019, the Board chose Commissioner Germaine Ortiz to serve as chair of the board, making her the first Latina to do so. This was also the first time that the Board had been entirely led by women: Mary Amoroso serving as Vice Chair and Joan Voss and Chair Pro-tempore.

Previous sessions

References 

Bergen County, New Jersey
County government in New Jersey